Jennifer O'Connor (born 13 April 1984 in Bundaberg, Australia) is an Australian netball player. She played with the Queensland Firebirds from 2006 to 2007 in the Commonwealth Bank Trophy, and from 2008 to 2009 in the ANZ Championship.

References
2008/09 Queensland Firebirds profile. Retrieved on 2008-05-07.

1984 births
Living people
Australian netball players
Netball players from Queensland
Queensland Firebirds players
Commonwealth Bank Trophy players
ANZ Championship players
Queensland Fusion players
Australian Netball League players
Sportspeople from Bundaberg